Nuestra Señora de los Remedios is a Catholic parish situated in Solar, Olutanga Island, Zamboanga Sibugay, Mindanao, Philippines. It is bordered in the northwest by the municipality of Payao, northeast by the municipality of Alicia, south by Demaquillas Bay, and west by Sibugay Bay. It has 32 chapels. Some of these are located in Muslim dominated areas.

Nuestra Señora de los Remedios Parish began as a Jesuit mission in 1950 when Fr. Raimundo Argarate, SJ, came to the island and established basic ecclesiastical communities. The statue of the patroness of the parish was donated by the Miranda family.

In 2005, the pastoral care of the Nuestra Señora de los Remedios was turned over to the Divine Word Missionaries or the SVD. Fr. Roger Alasan, SVD, became its first SVD parish priest.

In March 2008, Fr. Roger Alasan suffered a stroke and had a by-pass operation. He was transferred to the Divine Word Formation Center of Davao. Fr. Arvin was left to take charge of the parish. To assist him, Fr. Virgil moved from Mabuhay to Subanipa and Fr. Arvin became the new parish priest.

In March 2009, Fr. Danny Noval, SVD, arrived in Subanipa to assume the parish since Fr. Arvin was about to leave for Rome.

Sources 
 Witness to the Word, Logos Publications, 2009.
 NSDR 50th Anniversary, n. p., 2003.

Mexican culture
Divine Word Missionaries Order
Roman Catholic churches in Zamboanga Sibugay